Andre Joseph Orius Champagne (born September 19, 1943) is a Canadian retired ice hockey left winger. He played 2 games in the National Hockey League (NHL) for the Toronto Maple Leafs during the 1962–63 season. The rest of his career, which lasted from 1962 to 1970, was spent in the minor leagues..

Career statistics

Regular season and playoffs

External links
 

1943 births
Living people
Canadian ice hockey left wingers
Ice hockey people from Ottawa
Rochester Americans players
Toronto Maple Leafs players
Toronto Marlboros players
Toronto St. Michael's Majors players
Tulsa Oilers (1964–1984) players